Ronnie Gene Blevins (born June 20, 1977) is an American character actor. He is best known for his role as small-time criminal Willie Russell in the 2013 film Joe, directed by David Gordon Green.

Career
His TV credits include NCIS, True Detective, Kingdom and Twin Peaks. Other notable works include The Dark Knight Rises, Seven Psychopaths, Avenged and the 2017 remake of Death Wish.

Blevins wrote, produced and starred in the 2009 independent film American Cowslip.

Personal life
Blevins is deaf in one ear and blind in one eye. He is married to actress Veronica Burgess, with whom he has a son.

Filmography

Film

Television

References

External links
 

1977 births
Male actors from Texas
Living people
People from Harris County, Texas
21st-century American male actors
American male telenovela actors
American male television actors
American male film actors
American male deaf actors
American blind people